Saving for a Custom Van is a 2020 tribute album to Adam Schlesinger, who died earlier that year to COVID-19. Schlesinger wrote or co-wrote all of the songs. The title is a lyric from the first track, "Utopia Parkway." It was released on June 16, 2020 on Bandcamp and as a colored vinyl LP in 2022.

Track listing 
Source

References

External links
 Saving for a Custom Van at Father/Daughter Records

2020 albums
Father/Daughter Records albums